Twyford may refer to:

Places
In the United Kingdom:
Twyford, Berkshire
Twyford, Buckinghamshire
Twyford, Derbyshire, in the civil parish of Twyford and Stenson
Twyford, Dorset, a location
Twyford, Hampshire
Twyford, Leicestershire
Twyford, Norfolk
Twyford, Oxfordshire, in the civil parish of Adderbury
Twyford, Shropshire, in the civil parish of West Felton
Twyford, Worcestershire

In Ireland:
Twyford, County Westmeath, a townland in the civil parish of Ballyloughloe

In New Zealand
Twyford, New Zealand

People
 Holly Twyford, American stage actress and director
 Jack Twyford (1908–1991), Australian rules footballer
 Joshua Twyford (1640–1729), English pottery manufacturer
 Phil Twyford (born 1963), New Zealand politician
 Thomas Twyford (1849–1921), English pottery manufacturer

Businesses
Twyford Bathrooms

Schools
Twyford Church of England High School, a secondary school in West London